Manor Academy (formerly Manor High School) is a mixed secondary school for students with special needs. It is located in Sale and serves the whole borough of Trafford.

Previously a community school administered by Trafford Metropolitan Borough Council, Manor High School converted to academy status in January 2016 and was renamed Manor Academy. The school is now part of The Sovereign Trust.

References

External links
 Manor Academy

Special secondary schools in England
Schools in Sale, Greater Manchester
Special schools in Trafford
Academies in Trafford
Educational institutions established in 1997
1997 establishments in England